Elvis Thomas may refer to:
Elvis Thomas (soccer, born 1972), Canadian soccer player
Elvis Thomas (footballer, born 1994), Antiguan footballer

See also
Elvie Thomas, an American country blues singer and guitarist